The 2nd ceremony of the Feroz Awards was held at the Gran Teatro Ruedo Las Ventas in Madrid, on January 25, 2015. It was hosted by actress Bárbara Santa-Cruz and aired on Canal+ Spain.

Winners and nominees
The nominees were announced on December 16, 2014 in Barcelona. The winners and nominees are listed as follows:

Honorary Award 
 Honorary Feroz Award: Carlos Saura

Special Award 
 Special Award:

See also
29th Goya Awards

References

2015 film awards
Feroz Awards
2015 in Madrid
January 2015 events in Spain